In functional analysis, double operator integrals (DOI) are integrals of the form

where  is a bounded linear operator between two separable Hilbert spaces,

The integrals are to be understood in the form of Stieltjes integrals.

Double operator integrals can be used to estimate the differences of two operators and have application in perturbation theory. The theory was mainly developed by Mikhail Shlyomovich Birman and Mikhail Zakharovich Solomyak in the late 1960s and 1970s, however they appeared earlier first in a paper by Daletskii and Krein.

Double operator integrals 
The map

is called a transformer. We simply write , when it's clear which spectral measures we are looking at.

Originally Birman and Solomyak considered a Hilbert–Schmidt operator  and defined a spectral measure  by

for measurable sets , then the double operator integral  can be defined as

for bounded and measurable functions . However one can look at more general operators  as long as  stays bounded.

Examples

Perturbation theory 
As usual,  is the identity operator.

and so

Literature

References 

 Functional analysis
Definitions of mathematical integration